William George Wyld (3 December 1859 – 16 July 1900) was a Scottish first-class cricketer active 1879–87 who played for Surrey. He was born in Stirling and died in South Kensington. He played in ten first-class matches as a right-handed batsman, scoring 169 runs with a highest score of 34*.

References

1859 births
1900 deaths
Scottish cricketers
Surrey cricketers